The small penis rule is an informal strategy used by authors to evade libel lawsuits. It was described in a New York Times article by Dinitia Smith in 1998:

The small penis rule was referenced in a 2006 dispute between Michael Crowley and Michael Crichton. Crowley alleged that after he wrote an unflattering review of Crichton's novel State of Fear, Crichton included a character named "Mick Crowley" in the novel Next. The character is a child rapist, described as being a Washington, D.C.–based journalist and Yale graduate with a small penis.

See also
 Defamation
 Dignitary tort

References

1998 neologisms
Defamation
Human penis
Informal legal terminology
Rules
Human size